Tameribundy Parish is a civil Parish of Gregory County in New South Wales.

References

Parishes of Australia
Parishes of New South Wales